Dayar-e Assad Khan (also Romanized as Dāyār-e Assad Khān) is a village in Sanjabi Rural District, Kuzaran District, Kermanshah County, Kermanshah Province, Iran. At the 2006 census, its population was 68, in 15 families.

References 

Populated places in Kermanshah County